The Green Mountain Giant is one of the largest glacial erratics in New England. It is located in Whitingham, Vermont. It was plucked from the Green Mountains by moving glaciers (Laurentide Ice Sheet) and was dropped as the ice retreated. Its circumference is 125 feet, and its weight is 3400 tons. It has been documented by geologists since Edward Hitchcock (Vermont State Geologist 18561861).

References

Glacial erratics of the United States
Landforms of Windham County, Vermont